Pietro Antonio d'Alessandro (1628–1693) was a Roman Catholic prelate who served as Bishop of San Marco (1688–1693).

Biography
Pietro Antonio d'Alessandro was born in Zalatone, Italy on 4 June 1628 and ordained a priest on 8 March 1653.
On 31 May 1688, he was appointed during the papacy of Pope Innocent XI as Bishop of San Marco.
On 8 June 1688, he was consecrated bishop by Galeazzo Marescotti, Cardinal-Priest of Santi Quirico e Giulitta, with Pietro de Torres, Archbishop of Dubrovnik, and Pier Antonio Capobianco, Bishop Emeritus of Lacedonia, serving as co-consecrators. 
He served as Bishop of San Marco until his death on 28 September 1693.

References

External links and additional sources
 (for Chronology of Bishops) 
 (for Chronology of Bishops) 

17th-century Italian Roman Catholic bishops
Bishops appointed by Pope Innocent XI
1628 births
1693 deaths